Ioannis (Nanos) Valaoritis  (5 July 1921 – 12 September 2019) was a Greek writer, widely published as a poet, novelist and playwright since 1939; his correspondence with George Seferis (Allilographia 1945-1968, Ypsilon, Athens 2004) was a bestseller.  Raised within a cosmopolitan family with roots in the Greek War of Independence but twice driven into exile by events, Valaoritis lived in Greece, the United Kingdom, France and the United States, and as a writer and academic he played a significant role in introducing the literary idioms of each country to the rest.  The quality, the international appeal, and the influence of his work led Valaoritis to be described as the most important poet of the Hellenic diaspora since Constantine Cavafy.

Life

Early years 
Valaoritis was born to Greek parents in Lausanne in Switzerland in 1921 but grew up in Greece where he studied classics and law at Athens University.  He was also writing poetry, and in 1939 when he was barely eighteen, he saw himself published in the pages of George Katsimbalis’ review Nea Grammata alongside contributions from Odysseas Elytis and George Seferis, and was immediately taken into their literary circle.  It was an ominous yet heady time, those early months of the war, during which Valaoritis was witness to the seminal encounter of Seferis and Katsimbalis with Henry Miller and Lawrence Durrell, which was to resonate within both Greek and Anglo-Saxon literature for years to come.

Training years 
In 1944 Valaoritis escaped from German-occupied Greece across the Aegean to Turkey and from there through the Middle East to Egypt, where he made contact with Seferis who was serving the Greek government in exile as First Secretary of the Greek Legation in Cairo.  In 1944, at the instigation of Seferis, Valaoritis went to London to develop literary links between Greece and Britain.  He met T. S. Eliot, W. H. Auden, Dylan Thomas and Stephen Spender, and he worked for Louis MacNeice at the BBC.  As well as studying English literature at the University of London, he translated modernist Greek poets, among them Elytis and Embirikos, and contributed to Cyril Connolly's Horizon and to John Lehman's New Writing.  His own first volume of collected poems, E Timoria ton Magon (Punishment of Wizards), with decorations by John Craxton, was published in London in 1947.  He paved the way for Seferis' success in the English-speaking world by editing and translating, along with Durrell and Bernard Spencer, Seferis' King of Asine which was published in 1948 to enthusiastic reviews. 

Then in 1954 he moved to Paris where, as well as studying Mycenaean grammar at the Sorbonne, he was prominent among surrealist poets under André Breton. Valaoritis met his wife Marie Wilson, one evening at a large gathering in Paris full of Greek writers and artists. Marie Wilson was an American surrealist artist, Marie is the author of Apparitions: Paintings and Drawings by Marie Wilson. Wilson was embedded in the surrealist movement, and had a very close relationship with Andre Breton and Picasso. Nanos moved in together and lived there for six years, leading to marriage, which has now continued for forty years. They had three children together.

San Francisco, CA USA 
Valaoritis was a professor in the World and Comparative Literature and Creative Writing Departments at San Francisco State University from the 1970s until 1993, when he retired.

Back in Greece 
In 1960 Valaoritis returned to Greece, and between 1963 and 1967 he was publisher and chief editor of the Greek avant-garde literary review Pali.  But when the junta came to power in 1967, he felt he had no choice but to go into voluntary exile, and in 1968 he went to America where he became professor of comparative literature and creative writing at San Francisco State University, a position he held for twenty-five years.

A self-described surrealist, Valaoritis sometimes creates a sense of carnival in his work through parody, pastiche and absurdity.  But the bracket can be misleading, for surrealism alone fails to convey the depths of his mind and the richness of his work.  As in photographs taken of Valaoritis so in his poetry you see at once the mage and the pirate, or the detached Olympian with an outsider's bemusement yet a man who can also be intensely lyrical and sensual.

Once again Nanos Valaoritis lived in Greece, where he co-edited the literary review Synteleia (End of the World) and, optimistically, its successor Nea Synteleia (New End of the World) and published a remarkable body of work, including essays, translations, anthologies and books of poetry, short stories, a novella and four novels variously in Greek, English and French.  His most latest novel, the bestselling Broken Arms of the Venus de Milo (Agra, Athens 2002), is a literary and historical romp which has a basis in a true family story, for the arms of the famous Venus were lost at sea when a French naval vessel stole the statue from an ancestor of Valaoritis, a Greek who was the chief dragoman of the Ottoman navy.  Valaoritis’ Anthology of Modern Greek Poetry, co-edited with Thanasis Maskaleris (Talisman, New Jersey 2003) is encompassing and commanding, an invaluable contribution to the dissemination of Greek poetry throughout the English-speaking world, while Pan Daimonium, his latest volume of poetry (Philos Press, Lacey, Washington State 2005) showed him as playful, wise and enigmatic as ever.  

In 2004 the Athens Academy of Letters and Science awarded Nanos Valaoritis the prestigious prize for poetry in recognition of his life's work, and the President of Greece presented him with the Gold Cross of Honour, given for his services to Greek Letters.

Three of his poems are available on-line at the poetry journal Studio.

Works

Poetry
The Punishment of the Mages (Η Τιμωρία των Μάγων, 1947)
Central Arcade (Κεντρική Στοά, 1958)
Terre de Diamant 1958
Hired Hieroglyrhs 1970
Diplomatic Relations 1971
Anonymous Poem of Foteinos Saintjohn (Ανώνυμνο Ποίημα του Φωτεινού Αηγιάννη, 1977)
Εστίες Μικροβίων 1977
The Hero of Random (Ο Ήρωας του Τυχαίου, 1979)
Flash Bloom 1980
The Feathery Confession (Η Πουπουλένια Εξομολόγηση, 1982)
Some Women (Μερικές Γυναίκες, 1983)
Ο Διαμαντένιος Γαληνευτής 1981
Poems 1 (Ποιήματα 1, 1983)
Στο Κάτω Κάτω της Γραφής 1984
The Color Pen (Ο Έγχρωμος Στυλογράφος, 1986)
Poems 2 (Ποιήματα 2 1987)
Anideograms (Ανιδεογράμματα, 1996)
Sun, the Executioner of a Green Thought (Ήλιος, ο δήμιος μιας πράσινης σκέψης, 1996)
Allegoric Cassandra (Αλληγορική Κασσάνδρα, 1998)

Prose
The Traitor of the Written Words (Ο Προδότης του Γραπτού Λόγου, 1980)
Rising from the Bones (Απ' τα Κόκκαλα Βγαλμένη, 1982)
Xerxes; Treasure (Ο Θησαυρός του Ξέρξη, 1984)
The Murder (Η Δολοφονία, 1984)
The Talking Ape or Paramythologia (Ο Ομιλών Πίθηκος ή Παραμυθολογία, 1986)
My Afterlife Guaranteed, 1990
Paramythologia (Παραμυθολογία, 1996)
God's Dog (Ο Σκύλος του Θεού, 1998)

Essays
Andreas Empeirikos (Ανδρέας Εμπειρίκος, 1989)
To a Theory of Writing (Για μια Θεωρία της Γραφής, 1990)
Modernism, Avant Garde, and Pali (Μοντερνισμός, Πρωτοπορία και Πάλι, 1997)
Aristotelis Valaoritis, A Romantic (Αριστοτέλης Βαλαωρίτης, Ένας Ρομαντικός, 1998)

See also
 Aristotelis Valaoritis (the great-grandfather of Nanos Valaoritis)

References

1921 births
2019 deaths
Greek surrealist writers
Modern Greek poets
People from Lausanne
20th-century Greek poets
Greek expatriates in Switzerland
Expatriates in Egypt
Greek expatriates in the United Kingdom
Greek expatriates in France
Greek expatriates in the United States